The Union River is the name of multiple rivers.

In the United States
Union River (Maine)
Union River (Michigan)
Union River (Washington)

 Other
 Union River (St. Vincent) in Saint Vincent and the Grenadines